Kalyanpur is a municipality in Siraha District in the Sagarmatha Zone of south-eastern Nepal. At the time of the 2011 Nepal census it had a population of 49288 people living.

References

External links 
 UN map of the municipalities of  Siraha District

Populated places in Siraha District
Nepal municipalities established in 2017
Municipalities in Madhesh Province